In geometry of 4 dimensions, a 3-4 duoprism, the second smallest p-q duoprism, is a 4-polytope resulting from the Cartesian product of a triangle and a square.

The 3-4 duoprism exists in some of the uniform 5-polytopes in the B5 family.

Images

Related complex polygons

The quasiregular complex polytope 3{}×4{}, in  has a real representation as a 3-4 duoprism in 4-dimensional space. It has 12 vertices, and 4 3-edges and 3 4-edges. Its symmetry is 3[2]4, order 12.

Related polytopes
The birectified 5-cube,  has a uniform 3-4 duoprism vertex figure:

3-4 duopyramid 

The dual of a 3-4 duoprism is called a 3-4 duopyramid. It has 12 digonal disphenoid cells, 24  isosceles triangular faces, 12 edges, and 7 vertices.

See also

Polytope and polychoron
Convex regular polychoron
Duocylinder
Tesseract

Notes

References
Regular Polytopes, H. S. M. Coxeter, Dover Publications, Inc., 1973, New York, p. 124.
 Coxeter, The Beauty of Geometry: Twelve Essays, Dover Publications, 1999,    (Chapter 5: Regular Skew Polyhedra in three and four dimensions and their topological analogues)
 Coxeter, H. S. M. Regular Skew Polyhedra in Three and Four Dimensions. Proc. London Math. Soc. 43, 33–62, 1937.
 John H. Conway, Heidi Burgiel, Chaim Goodman-Strass, The Symmetries of Things 2008,  (Chapter 26)
 Norman Johnson Uniform Polytopes, Manuscript (1991)
 N.W. Johnson: The Theory of Uniform Polytopes and Honeycombs, Ph.D. Dissertation, University of Toronto, 1966

External links
The Fourth Dimension Simply Explained—describes duoprisms as "double prisms" and duocylinders as "double cylinders"
Polygloss - glossary of higher-dimensional terms
Exploring Hyperspace with the Geometric Product

4-polytopes